Honda NSR is a two-stroke Grand Prix racing motorcycle built by the Honda Racing Corporation, and also a race replica road motorcycle produced mainly for Asian and European markets.

The official factory racing machines series included:
 NSR250
 NSR500 (and privateer-dedicated NSR500V)

Neither racing model designation is currently in use, with the NSR500 having been replaced by the MotoGP RC211V series when the premiere class returned to four stroke motors, and the NSR250 being discontinued in favor of the RS250 model designation.

The race replica series includes:
 Honda NSR50
 Honda NSR125
 Honda NSR150
 Honda NSR250R

References

External links
 NSR-WORLD.COM - The World's largest Honda NSR resource. Tuning information, technical specifications, parts manuals, model history, and discussion/help forum.
 NSR500 Heritage - official Honda page for heritage info on the NSR500

NSR